Dunbarney House Windmill is located just to the southwest of Dunbarney House near the Scottish town of Alyth, Perth and Kinross. A vaulted tower mill dating to the early 18th century, it is now a scheduled monument and Category B listed building.

A number of old windmills that were no longer required were converted to other uses such as barns, stores, ice-houses, look-out towers and dovecotes. Dunbarney is a typical example of a vaulted tower mill, as are those at Sauchie, Gordonstoun, Monkton and Ballantrae.

References

Windmills in Scotland
18th-century establishments in Scotland
Buildings and structures in Perth and Kinross
Scheduled Ancient Monuments in Perth and Kinross
Category B listed buildings in Perth and Kinross